The Fulham F.C. Academy is a football academy in London.

The Academy, headed by director Hew Jennings, runs along the lines of many of the English football academies as deemed appropriate by the national governing body, and recently awarded Category 2 status in the new EPPP guidelines set out by the FA. Players dealt with by the academy can be aged as young as nine years old. As part of their training, young players are guided with the aim to gain a BTEC and NVQ qualification.

The Fulham under 18's are two-time reigning champions of their league but last year also went on to win the National Academy Final beating Blackburn 2-0 with goals from Cauley Woodrow and Ryan Williams, losing to Everton at the same stage the previous year 2-1 with Ronny Minkwitz scoring.

Current management
(As of Academy Staff)

Academy Players

PL2
(As of PL2 – Player Profiles)

Out on loan

Under-18s
(As of Under-18s - Player Profiles)

Academy graduates
Below is a comprehensive list of Academy graduates from recent history, details of their senior debut and where they are now.

1997/98
Sean Davis v Cambridge United (Division Three), now retired

1998/99
Luke Cornwall v Notts County (Division Two), now retired

2000/01
Zat Knight v Northampton Town (EFL Cup First Round), now retired, has played for England
Mark Hudson v Chesterfield Town (EFL Cup Second Round), now retired
Elvis Hammond v Chesterfield Town (EFL Cup Second Round), now retired, has played for Ghana.
Calum Willock v Huddersfield Town (Division One), now retired, has played for Saint Kitts and Nevis

2002/03
Dean Leacock v Wigan Athletic (EFL Cup Fourth Round), now at Lowestoft Town

2003/04
Adam Green v Wigan Athletic (EFL Cup Second Round), now at Leatherhead
Darren Pratley v Wigan Athletic (EFL Cup Second Round), now at Leyton Orient
Zesh Rehman v Wigan Athletic (EFL Cup Second Round), now retired, has played for Pakistan
Malik Buari v Everton (Premier League), now retired

2004/05
Liam Rosenior v Boston United (EFL Cup Second Round), now retired
Michael Timlin v Boston United (EFL Cup Second Round), now at Dulwich Hamlet
Liam Fontaine v Southampton (Premier League), now at Edinburgh

2006/07
Matthew Briggs v Middlesbrough (Premier League), now at Gosport Borough, has played for Guyana
Elliot Omozusi v Wycombe Wanderers (EFL Cup Second Round), now at Barking

2007/08
Wayne Brown v Bristol Rovers (FA Cup Third Round), now retired

2008/09
Robert Milsom v Burnley (EFL Cup Third Round), now at Sutton United
Chris Smalling v Everton (Premier League), now at Roma, has played for England

2009/10
Joe Anderson v Manchester City (EFL Cup Third Round), now at Welling United

2011/12
Lauri Dalla Valle v NSÍ Runavík (Europa League Qualifier), now retired
Kerim Frei v NSÍ Runavík (Europa League Qualifier), now at Fatih Karagümrük, has played for Turkey
Tom Donegan v Crusaders (Europa League Qualifier), last known to be at Rhyl
Neil Etheridge v Odense Boldklub (Europa League Group Stage), now at Birmingham City, has played for Philippines
Marcello Trotta v Everton (FA Cup Fourth Round), now at Avellino
Alexander Kačaniklić v Norwich City (Premier League), now at AEL Limassol, has played for Sweden

2012/13
Alex Smith v West Bromwich Albion (Premier League), now at Hastings United

2013/14
Mesca v Chelsea (Premier League), now at Doxa Katokopias
Moussa Dembélé v West Ham United (Premier League), now at Lyon
Dan Burn v Norwich City (FA Cup Third Round), now at Newcastle United
Chris David v Norwich City (FA Cup Third Round), now at Yeni Mersin İdmanyurdu
Ange-Freddy Plumain v Norwich City (FA Cup Third Round), now at Sektzia Ness Ziona, has played for Guadeloupe
Lasse Vigen Christensen v Norwich City (FA Cup Third Round), now at Zulte Waregem
Muamer Tanković v Norwich City (FA Cup Third Round), now at Pafos, has played for Sweden
Josh Passley v Sheffield United (FA Cup Fourth Round), now at Havant & Waterlooville
Cauley Woodrow v Cardiff City (Premier League), now at Luton 
Patrick Roberts v Manchester City (Premier League), now at Sunderland

2014/15
Emerson Hyndman v Ipswich Town (EFL Championship), last at Atlanta United, has played for United States
Cameron Burgess v Ipswich Town (EFL Championship), now at Ipswich Town
Jesse Joronen v Ipswich Town (EFL Championship), now at Venezia, has played for Finland
George Williams v Millwall (EFL Championship), now at Boreham Wood, has played for Wales
Seán Kavanagh v Wolverhampton Wanderers (EFL Championship), now at Shamrock Rovers
Ryan Williams v Wolverhampton Wanderers (EFL Championship), now at Perth Glory, has played for Australia
Marcus Bettinelli v Brentford (EFL Cup Second Round), now at Chelsea
Stephen Arthurworrey v Derby County, (EFL Cup Fourth Round), now retired
Jack Grimmer v Brighton & Hove Albion (EFL Championship), now at Wycombe Wanderers

2016/17
Ryan Sessegnon v Leyton Orient (EFL Cup First Round), now at Tottenham Hotspur
Dennis Adeniran v Leyton Orient (EFL Cup First Round), now at Sheffield Wednesday
Tayo Edun v Leyton Orient (EFL Cup First Round), now at Blackburn Rovers
Luca de la Torre v Leyton Orient (EFL Cup First Round), now at Celta, has played for United States
Stephen Humphrys v Derby County (EFL Championship), now at Wigan Athletic

2017/18
Marek Rodák v Wycombe Wanderers (EFL Cup First Round), still at Fulham, has played for Slovakia
Matt O'Riley v Wycombe Wanderers (EFL Cup First Round), now at Celtic
Steven Sessegnon v Wycombe Wanderers (EFL Cup First Round), still at Fulham

2018/19
Harvey Elliott v Millwall (EFL Cup Third Round), now at Liverpool

2019/20
Tyrese Francois v Southampton (EFL Cup Second Round), still at Fulham
Ben Davis v Southampton (EFL Cup Second Round), now at Oxford United
Martell Taylor-Crossdale v Southampton (EFL Cup Second Round), now at Metropolitan Police
Jay Stansfield v Aston Villa (FA Cup Third Round), still at Fulham
Sylvester Jasper v Manchester City (FA Cup Fourth Round), still at Fulham

2020/21
Fábio Carvalho v Sheffield Wednesday (EFL Cup Third Round), now at Liverpool

2021/22
Adrion Pajaziti v Birmingham City (EFL Cup Second Round), still at Fulham

2022/23
Luke Harris v Crawley Town (EFL Cup Second Round), still at Fulham

References

External links
Academy page at FulhamFC.com

Academy
Football academies in England
Premier League International Cup